Toula Limnaios (Greek: Toula Limneos Τούλα Λιμναίος, * 1963 in Athens) is a Greek choreographer, performer and, alongside a composer Ralf R. Ollertz, artistic director of cie. toula limnaios, a dance company based in HALLE TANZBÜHNE BERLIN.

Biography 

After completing her studies in classical and modern dance, M. Alexander and Laban technique, music and dance education, she worked as a dancer with Claudio Bernardo and Régine Chopinot, and as an assistant with Pierre Droulers. Limnaios received further education at the Folkwang University of the Arts (at that time: Folkwagen University), where she studied together with Susanne Linke, Malou Airaudo, Jean Cébron, Lutz Förster and Dominique Mercy. She soon became a member of a Folkwang Dance Studio under the artistic direction of Pina Bausch.
Limnaios made her name by performing live- improvisations of the Duo Landscapes, she founded together with the musicians Conny Bauer and Peter Kowald. In 1996 she founded cie. toula limaios, a contemporary dance company that brought her choreographic art onto the stages worldwide, including Africa, Belgium, Brazil, Germany, Lithuania, Latvia, Denmark, Ecuador, France, Ireland, Spain, Italy, Austria, Poland, Venezuela etc.

Apart from managing her ensemble, Limnaios works as a guest choreographer at the Theater Osnabrück and the Frankfurt University of Performing Arts (Hochschule für Darstellende Künste Frankfurt/Main). Between 2007 and 2008 she was a guest professor at the Ernst Busch Academy of Dramatic Arts (Hochschule für Schauspielkunst „Ernst Busch“ ) in Berlin.

Toula Limnaios is one of the most eminent figures of German dance scene.

References 

 Der Tagesspiegel (The Daily Mirror), a special issue on the George Tabori Theatre Award 2012, The Fund for Performing Arts, 16. – 23.05.2012.
 Elisabeth Nehring: Mehr Schärfe und Radikalität. In: Berliner Zeitung, Kultur, 05.08.2013.
 Sandra Luzina: Evolution im Zeitraffer. In: Der Tagesspiegel, Kultur, 05.08.2013.
 Karin Schmidt-Feister:  Das Brennen unter der Haut in: Neues Deutschland, Berlin – Kultur, 08.08.2013.
 Mareen Ledebur: Ich glaube nicht an ein Nomadenleben. In: taz. die tageszeitung'', Kultur, 01.08.2013.
 Tanz-Journal, Issues 4–6, Kieser Verlag, München, 2005.
 The Beckett Circle, Volumes 17–26, p. 9, Samuel Beckett Society, 2001.

External links 
 Homepage Cie. toula limnaios
 Goethe-Institut/ 50 Choreographers
 HALLE-TANZBÜHNE BERLIN

1963 births
Living people
Greek choreographers
Greek emigrants to Germany
Academic staff of the Ernst Busch Academy of Dramatic Arts
Dancers from Berlin
People from Athens